The Midwives Alliance of North America (MANA) was founded in April 1982 to build cooperation among midwives and to promote midwifery as a means of improving health care for North American women and their families. Its stated goal is to unify and strengthen the profession of midwifery, thereby improving the quality of health care for women, babies, and communities.

History 
When MANA was founded there were many organizations that midwives had been instrumental in organizing and that provided a means of communication and support. However none had a membership base broad enough, an internal support system, or the political credibility to promote midwifery as an accepted part of the maternal-child health care system in North America. In October 1981, Sister Angela Murdaugh, of the American College of Nurse-Midwives, invited four non-nurse midwives and four nurse-midwives from around the country to Washington D.C. to discuss issues confronting all midwives, with special emphasis on the communication concerns between American midwives trained as nurses and those who were not formally trained. A decision was made to form a "Guild" that would include all midwives with four purposes in mind: to expand communication among midwives; to set educational and training guidelines; to set guidelines for basic competency and safety for practicing midwives; and to form an identifiable professional organization for all midwives in the U.S. Throughout its history MANA has advocated for the belief that birthing mothers should be able to choose their places and caregivers at birth and that midwifery should be decriminalized.

In April 1982, nearly 100 women from around the country met in Lexington, Kentucky. At this meeting the name Midwives Alliance of North America was chosen, and it was decided that Canadian midwives would be included in the organization. Officers were chosen and a newsletter Practicing Midwife (changed to MANA News in 1983) was established. In October 1983, the first MANA convention was held, and the members elected Teddy Charvet as President, Ina May Gaskin as Vice President, and Rena Porteus as second Vice President.

Much of MANA's organizational energy has been directed toward making national midwifery certification acceptable and workable within the medical community and thereby accessible to women. By 1986, it had become clear that midwives needed to create an internationally accepted direct-entry midwifery credential if they were to preserve the unique forms of practice which midwives had developed over the last thirty years and at the same time work within the larger healthcare community. To this end MANA launched the North American Registry of Midwives (NARM). NARM became a separately incorporated entity in 1992 and since has developed a competency-based certification process.

Out of the formal support network generated by MANA, the Midwifery Education Accreditation Council (MEAC) was established in 1991. In conjunction with NARM, it accredits a wide variety of direct-entry midwifery educational programs, including apprenticeships, thus formally validating and preserving ancient as well as modern routes to practice.

Goals 
According to the MANA website, the organization's goals are:

 To engage midwives in dialog and to encourage solidarity across North America.
 To recognize the diversity among midwives and to foster inclusive community building.
 To build an identity as a cohesive organization representing the profession as well as the tradition of midwifery at regional, national and international levels.
 To position midwives as acknowledged authorities, working to improve perinatal health in collaboration with other professionals.
 To collect and disseminate high quality research about midwifery care.
 To promote excellence in midwifery practice.
 To sponsor continuing education opportunities for midwives.
 To increase access to midwives in all settings.
 To endorse the Midwives Model of Care as the gold standard for childbirth.
 To affirm the rights of pregnant women to give birth where and with whom they choose.

Membership 
MANA membership includes midwives and student midwives, other healthcare providers, and families. Over one-third of MANA's member midwives are certified professional midwives (CPMs), the remainder are certified nurse midwives, certified midwives, state-licensed midwives, traditional midwives, and student/apprentice midwives.

Research
MANA's Division of Research maintains a registry of midwife-assisted births in the US and Canada, that can be made available for use in research upon request. Published research has provided descriptive evidence on practice and safety of recorded home births, but contribution to the data set is voluntary and direct comparisons to hospital births remain difficult.

See also
 Childbirth
 Doula
 Midwife

References

External links
 Midwives Alliance of North America (MANA)
Midwives' Alliance of North America records at the Sophia Smith Collection, Smith College Special Collections

Midwifery organizations
Organizations established in 1982
1982 establishments in the United States